The Office of Distance Education (ODE) was founded in July 1998 on the campus of the Arkansas School for Mathematics, Sciences, and the Arts in Hot Springs, Arkansas and is now a part of the University of Arkansas System. Originally established in order to expand educational opportunities in Arkansas’ rural schools, the Office of Distance Education uses H.323-based video conferencing to provide highly qualified, fully certified teachers to school districts nationwide unable to hire qualified faculty locally.

Operations
During its first year of operation, ODE enrolled 228 high school students from 23 school districts across Arkansas. For school year 2010 - 2011, ODE initial enrollment exceeded 3,600 students from approximately one hundred school districts in eight states.

ODE offers complete elementary, middle grades and high school curricula as well as College Board-approved Advanced Placement courses and Concurrent Enrollment courses that allow students to earn college credit.

Of particular note, ODE has been recognized repeatedly by the United States Distance Learning Association for the excellence of its instructors and programming in years 2007, 2008, 2009, 2010 and 2011 including awards for Excellence in Distance Learning Teaching, Excellence in Distance Learning Programing and Leadership in the Field of Distance Education.  In addition, ODE was recognized by ComputerWorld as a Laureate in 2010.  ODE’s programs are accredited by the North Central Association Commission on Accreditation and School Improvement. 

ODE also offers training to students and teachers nationwide, including ACT preparation, using Wiki’s in the classroom, teaching language with TPRS, and other programs.

ODE operates through a pay for service model which allows instruction to be delivered with real teachers in real time at any location. The Office has partnered with St. George's Church of England Primary School in Birmingham, England in order to share Spanish classes between British and Arkansas elementary students, as well as the East Central Board of Cooperative Education and Swink High School in Eastern Colorado providing Spanish, French, and German instruction.

External links
Office of Distance Education
ECBOCES
Arkansas School for Mathematics, Sciences and the Arts
United States Distance Learning Association

Distance education institutions based in the United States
Educational technology non-profits
Public education in Arkansas